Wamego  is a city in Pottawatomie County, Kansas, United States.  As of the 2020 census, the population of the city was 4,841.

History
Wamego was platted in 1866. It was named for a Potawatomi Native American chief.

The first post office in Wamego was established in October 1866.

Geography
Wamego is located at  (39.204074, -96.308328).

Wamego is located at the intersection of U.S. Route 24 and K-99. The Kansas River flows along the southern edge of the city.

Climate
The climate in this area is characterized by hot, humid summers and generally mild to cool winters.  According to the Köppen Climate Classification system, Wamego has a humid subtropical climate, abbreviated "Cfa" on climate maps.

Demographics

Wamego is part of the Manhattan, Kansas Metropolitan Statistical Area.

2010 census
As of the census of 2010, there were 4,372 people, 1,758 households, and 1,176 families living in the city. The racial makeup of the city was 94.1% White, 0.8% African American, 0.6% Native American, 0.5% Asian, 0.1% Pacific Islander, 1.0% from other races, and 2.9% from two or more races. Hispanic or Latino of any race were 3.9% of the population.

There were 1,758 households, of which 37.3% had children under the age of 18 living with them, 51.1% were married couples living together, 11.6% had a female householder with no husband present, 4.2% had a male householder with no wife present, and 33.1% were non-families. 27.5% of all households were made up of individuals, and 12.2% had someone living alone who was 65 years of age or older. The average household size was 2.45 and the average family size was 3.00.

The median age in the city was 33.3 years. 27.3% of residents were under the age of 18; 8.5% were between the ages of 18 and 24; 28.6% were from 25 to 44; 22.3% were from 45 to 64; and 13.3% were 65 years of age or older. The gender makeup of the city was 47.6% male and 52.4% female.

2000 census
As of the census of 2000, there were 4,246 people, 1,630 households, and 1,155 families living in the city. The racial makeup of the city was 96.75% White, 0.73% African American, 0.35% Native American, 0.12% Asian, 0.78% from other races, and 1.27% from two or more races. Hispanic or Latino of any race were 1.88% of the population.

There were 1,630 households, out of which 38.3% had children under the age of 18 living with them, 56.7% were married couples living together, 10.8% had a female householder with no husband present, and 29.1% were non-families. 25.1% of all households were made up of individuals, and 11.8% had someone living alone who was 65 years of age or older. The average household size was 2.57 and the average family size was 3.09.

In the city, the population was spread out, with 29.4% under the age of 18, 8.9% from 18 to 24, 29.3% from 25 to 44, 17.8% from 45 to 64, and 14.6% who were 65 years of age or older. The median age was 34 years. For every 100 females, there were 93.3 males. For every 100 females age 18 and over, there were 88.7 males.

The median income for a household in the city was $38,115, and the median income for a family was $46,017. Males had a median income of $29,881 versus $21,974 for females. The per capita income for the city was $16,307. About 5.7% of families and 8.6% of the population were below the poverty line, including 9.1% of those under age 18 and 18.0% of those age 65 or over.

Economy
The primary industry of the area is agriculture. The broad river valley is used to grow alfalfa, sweetcorn, maize and wheat. In the hills around the city, rocky pastures support herds of cattle. There is a processing plant for alfalfa in Wamego. The other major industry is a factory which produces attachments for earth-moving and other heavy construction equipment, wholly owned by Caterpillar, Inc. Many of the residents of the city commute to nearby areas for employment, chiefly Manhattan and Topeka.

Area attractions

Wamego City Park

Wamego is home to a 12-acre park in the center of town that includes several historic features. The Dutch Mill, a stone windmill built in 1879, is located in the Park, along with the Wamego Historical Museum and Prairie Town Village. Prairie Town Village is a collection of buildings from the 1800s that are a part of Wamego's history. The City Park includes a swimming pool, tennis courts, playground, and fishing pond.

Oz Museum
Wamego is home to a museum dedicated to The Wizard of Oz, featuring a collection of over 25,000 Oz artifacts on permanent loan from Friar Johnpaul Cafiero. The Museum was founded in April 2004, and led to the development of several other small businesses with the Oz theme, which have come to be known as the "Oz Cluster." Prominent Oz-related businesses include the Oz Winery, Lincoln Street Station, Barleycorns and Toto's Tacoz. On the first weekend of October, Wamego holds its Annual OZtoberFEST, an Oktoberfest-type celebration with an Oz theme. The annual street festival typically hosts Hot Air Balloon Rides, Tallgrass Brewery Beer Garden, the Yellow Brick Road Bike Ride, and a local stage or music production.

Points of interest
 The Columbian Theatre
 Wamego City Park, Windmill, and Wamego Area Veterans Memorial
 Poppyfield Gallery
 Walter Percy Chrysler boyhood home
 Wamego Public Library
 Patti Page Exhibit

Filmmaking
Wamego served as the backdrop for the independent film production of Steve Balderson's surrealist crime drama, Firecracker.

Education
The community is served by Wamego USD 320 public school district, which provides Kindergarten through 12th grade public education. Highland Community College has a branch facility in the city.

Notable people
 Steve Balderson, filmmaker
 Benjamin Butler, painter
 Walter Chrysler, automobile manufacturer, founder of Chrysler Corporation, born in Wamego but soon after his birth, his parents moved to Ellis, Kansas
 Maggie May, model, Playboy playmate
 Travis Metcalf, professional baseball player
 William Pickard, LSD chemist, was arrested one mile northwest of Wamego, serving two life sentences in federal prison
 Wiley Taylor, professional baseball player

See also
 Great Flood of 1951

References

Further reading

External links

 , official website
 Wamego - Directory of Public Officials
 Visit Wamego
  Wamego Historical Society
 Wamego city map, KDOT

Cities in Pottawatomie County, Kansas
Cities in Kansas
Manhattan, Kansas metropolitan area
1866 establishments in Kansas
Populated places established in 1866